Peter Laverty (1926–2013) was a painter, print maker, art educator and gallery director. In 1971 to become Head of the National Art School, Sydney, Australia and was Director of the Art Gallery of New South Wales from 1971 to 1977.

Life and career 
Peter Phillip Laverty was born in England in 1926 and studied at Winchester School of Art. In 1951, at age 24, he emigrated to Sydney, Australia, to teach at the National art School, Sydney, from 1952 to 1971. He was appointed Director of the Art Gallery of New South Wales from 1971-1977.

Laverty served on numerous committees including: International Society of Art Critics,  NSW Travelling Art Scholarship (1971–78), Sydney Biennale Committee (1975–77), Churchill Fellowships (1971–77), and New South Wales art education assessment committees. He judged many art competitions, wrote for several art journals, while giving numerous lectures.

He was a foundation member and President  (1980–81) of Sydney Printmakers and member of the Australian Watercolour Institute from 1965.

Peter Laverty died in Sydney, Australia, in 2013, aged 86

Work 
Laverty worked in oil, watercolour and graphic media. From 1959 his paintings were mainly semi-abstract stylistically related to contemporary British paintings.

Exhibitions 
Laverty was included in several significant group exhibitions of Australian art held in New Zealand (1965), United States (1966), and Sao Paulo Biennale, Brazil (1961). In Australia he held joint exhibitions with his wife Ursula and had a retrospective at Penrith Sydney, in 1996.

Represented 
Works by Laverty are held in the collections of the National Gallery of Australia, Art Gallery of New South Wales, Art Gallery of Western Australia, and the Tasmanian Museum and Art Gallery.

Awards 
Laverty won numerous Shire art awards including; Warringah (1957), Mosman (1961-2), Maitland (1965), Campbelltown (1966), Rockdale (1966), Berrima (1966), and Grafton (1969).

Further reading 
 The New McCulloch’s Encyclopedia of Australian Art, The Miegunyah Press, 2006.
 International Who's Who in Art and Antiques, Hon. General editor: Ernest Kay, Melrose Press, 1972.
 Dictionary of International Biography, Vol 15, Melrose Press Ltd.
 Artists and Galleries of Australia, Max Germaine, Boolarong Publications, 1984.
 Australian Watercolour Painters-1780 to the Present Day, Jean Campbell, Craftsman House, 1989.
http://www.smh.com.au/comment/obituaries/an-artist-driven-by-his-passions-20130913-2tq8u.html

References

External links 
 Art Gallery of New South Wales website

1929 births
2013 deaths
20th-century Australian painters
20th-century British male artists
20th-century British painters
21st-century Australian painters
21st-century male artists
21st-century British painters
British male painters
Australian printmakers
Alumni of the University of Southampton
20th-century British printmakers
Directors and Presidents of the Art Gallery of New South Wales
Australian male painters
21st-century British male artists